MAPS College (formerly the MAPS Institute or the Modern Academy for Professional Studies) is a private educational institution located in Janavaree Magu, Malé, Maldives.

MAPS College
The college was founded in 1999, and awarded college status in 2011.  It provides post-secondary courses in accounting, finance, management, hospitality, and technology. In 2011, the institution moved to a new campus.

The college is operated by MAPS Maldives Private Ltd, a subsidiary of the FALIM Group.

MAPS International High 
MAPS International High is a senior high school that was established in 2011 by MAPS College.  It accepts students in grades 11 and 12, and offers GCE Advanced Level training and Edexcel Alevel and Edexcel International Diplomas.

References

External links
 
 Summary page
 International High School 
 The MAPS team competing in The Interns Show, a national reality television show about marketing

Schools in the Maldives
Educational institutions established in 1999
1999 establishments in the Maldives
2011 in the Maldives
Malé
Education in the Maldives
Educational organisations based in the Maldives